Michał Choromański (9 June O.S. 1904 – 14 May 1972), was a Polish writer, playwright and translator. He is best known for his novelistic studies of psychological states.

Early life and education
Michał Choromański was born in Yelisavetgrad (now Kropyvnytskyi), into a Polish doctor's family as the son of biologist Konstanty Choromański, who died during World War I. He spent his childhood and youth in Yelisavetgrad and attended the high school and the Technical School of Economics. Experiencing chaos and the horrors of revolutionary Russia, Choromański moved from Yelisavetgrad first to Warsaw and then to Podhale in 1924. He studied pedagogy and psychology and as a 17-year-old started working  as a tutor, paramedic and hospital administrator, drawing teacher and literary director of a workers' club and wrote reviews for a suburban newspaper. He was also interested in painting and created portraits. He fell ill from ankle tuberculosis, caused by stress and misery, but was able to avoid leg amputation and was treated in spas.

Popular books

  (1931)
  (1932), screened (1973)
  (1934)
  (printed in „Czas” 1937, separate edition 1959)
  (1958)
  (1965), screened (1988)
  (1966)
  (1968)
  (1968)
  (1969)
  (1969)
  (1970)
  (1970)
  (1972)
  (1976)
  (1979) 
  (1993); filmed as the Polish comedy horror '' (1995)

References

1904 births
1972 deaths